Chionosticta niveisparsa is a species of beetle in the family Cerambycidae, and the only species in the genus Chionosticta. It was described by Holzschuh in 1981.

References

Agapanthiini
Beetles described in 1981
Monotypic Cerambycidae genera
Taxa named by Carolus Holzschuh